This is a list of United States tariffs.

 1789: Tariff of 1789 (Hamilton Tariff)
 1790: Tariff of 1790
 1792: Tariff of 1792
 1816: Tariff of 1816 
 1824: Tariff of 1824 
 1828: Tariff of 1828 
 1832: Tariff of 1832
 1833: Tariff of 1833 
 1842: Tariff of 1842 
 1846: Walker tariff
 1857: Tariff of 1857
 1861: Morrill Tariff
 1872: Tariff of 1872
 1875: Tariff of 1875
 1883: Tariff of 1883 (Mongrel Tariff)
 1890: McKinley Tariff
 1894: Wilson–Gorman Tariff Act
 1897: Dingley Tariff
 1909: Payne–Aldrich Tariff Act
 1913: Revenue Act of 1913 (Underwood Tariff)
 1921: Emergency Tariff of 1921
 1922: Fordney–McCumber Tariff
 1930: Smoot–Hawley Tariff Act
 1934: Reciprocal Tariff Act
 1947: General Agreement on Tariffs and Trade 
 1962: Trade Expansion Act 
 1974: Trade Act of 1974
 1979: Trade Agreements Act of 1979
 1984: Trade and Tariff Act of 1984
 1988: Omnibus Foreign Trade and Competitiveness Act
 1994: World Trade Organization created
 2002: 2002 United States steel tariff
 2002: Trade Act of 2002
 2009: Chinese tire tariffs
 2018: Trump tariffs

Tariffs

International trade-related lists
History of foreign trade of the United States